Wonnie is an unincorporated community in Magoffin County, Kentucky, United States.  It lies along U.S. Route 460 and Kentucky Route 1081 northwest of the city of Salyersville, the county seat of Magoffin County.  Its elevation is 814 feet (248 m).

References

Unincorporated communities in Magoffin County, Kentucky
Unincorporated communities in Kentucky